S.I.S (Hangul: 에스아이에스 "S.I.S.") is a South Korean girl group formed by Double X Entertainment in 2017. They debuted on August 25, 2017, with I've Got A Feeling.

Career 
In 2017 all members participated in KBS's The Unit: Idol Rebooting Project; however, only Anne, Gaeul and Sebin passed the audition stage. Sebin was eliminated at rank 55, Gaeul was eliminated at rank 39 and Anne was eliminated at rank 22. 

Later on, Anne was shown as a back-up performer in UNB's Black Heart and was seen in performances with them alongside DIA's Jueun, former Beatwin member Jungha and BAE173's Hangyul. Hangyul and Jungha had participated in The Unit alongside Anne.

On 31 December 2018, S.I.S announced their fandom name to be "MILY" (밀리).  

On 7 February 2019, it was announced that member Dal was preparing for a solo debut. She debuted on February 10 with the digital single "Sad Love Story".

On 13 July 2019, Double X Entertainment revealed that "S.I.S will be promoting as a 4-member group with Minji, Gaeul, Anne and Sebin from now on." Double X added on, "our contract with member Jihye recently came to an end [...] Dal, on the other hand, will be taking a hiatus from her promotions due to personal reason." It was then revealed on Dal’s personal Instagram account that she has left the company and is no longer a member of the group.

Members
 Minzy (민지) – Main Rapper, Main Dancer, Sub-Vocalist
 Gaeul (가을) – Sub-Vocalist
 Anne (앤) – Sub-Vocalist, Lead Dancer, Face of the Group
 Sebin (세빈) – Sub-Vocalist, Maknae

Former members
 J.Sun (지해) – leader, lead vocalist
 Dal (달) – Main Vocalist

Discography

Single albums

Singles

References

South Korean girl groups
South Korean dance music groups
Musical groups established in 2017
K-pop music groups
Musical groups from Seoul
2017 establishments in South Korea
South Korean pop music groups